Toyozakura Toshiaki (born March 12, 1974 as Toshiaki Mukō) is a former sumo wrestler from Hiroshima, Japan. He made his debut in 1989, and after many years in the lower ranks he reached the top division for the first time in 2003. His highest rank was maegashira 5. He was a runner-up in one tournament and earned one special prize for Fighting Spirit. He is the younger brother of Kitazakura. He was forced to retire in April 2011 after an investigation by the Japan Sumo Association found him guilty of match-fixing.

Career
Toyozakura's father was also a sumo wrestler, who fought under the same shikona or sumo name, but he never climbed higher than the fourth sandanme division. He encouraged his son to join a different stable than Kitakazura, so Toyozakura joined Tatsutagawa stable. This stable folded in 2000 upon the stablemaster's retirement and Toyozakura moved to Michinoku stable. He made his professional debut in March 1989. He first reached elite sekitori status in September 1998 upon promotion to the second jūryō division but he could not maintain that rank. It took him another five years to reach the top division, which he finally achieved in November 2003 after re-entering the second division in September 2002. The 88 tournaments it took him to get there is the sixth-slowest ever—even longer than Kitazakura, who took 86 tournaments to reach makuuchi (in 2001).

Though Toyozakura is lesser known than his brother Kitazakura, he spent 17 tournaments in the top makuuchi division, which was five more than his brother, and he also reached a higher rank, maegashira 5. He achieved this after a strong 12-3 record in July 2004, where he finished runner-up to yokozuna Asashōryū, winning the Fighting Spirit prize. He peaked with this performance, however, as he only managed a majority of wins against losses on two further occasions in makuuchi, and spent more time back in jūryō than in the top division.

In May 2008 it emerged that the previous January, Toyozakura had beaten a junior wrestler in his stable up to ten times with a ladle, so badly that he required eight stitches. Coming in the wake of the death of trainee Takeshi Saito, he was severely criticised for such actions and issued an apology. Both he and his stablemaster Michinoku-oyakata were docked 30 percent of their salary by the Japan Sumo Association for three months.

His 10-5 performance at the rank of jūryō 4 in January 2009 was enough for a surprise return to the top division for the first time in over two years at maegashira 16. However, he could win only five bouts in the March 2009 tournament. Following the suspension and subsequent demotion of six wrestlers to the jūryō division in September 2010, he returned to makuuchi once again at the age of 36 despite only barely making his majority of wins at the rank of jūryō 11 in the July tournament. His tenth promotion to the top division for the January 2011 tournament put him in fourth place on the all-time list behind Ōshio, Ōnishiki and Ōtsukasa for most promotions to makuuchi.

Retirement from sumo

Toyozakura was one of 23 wrestlers found guilty of fixing the result of bouts after an investigation by the Japan Sumo Association, and he was forced to retire in April 2011.

Fighting style

Toyozakura's favourite techniques were open-handed thrusts known as tsuppari, and simple pushes to the opponent's chest, oshi-dashi. When he chose to fight on the mawashi his preferred grip was migi-yotsu, a left-hand outside, right-hand inside position. He also frequently employed hiki-otoshi, the pull down, and the similar hataki-komi, or slap down.

Career record

See also
List of sumo tournament second division champions
Glossary of sumo terms
List of past sumo wrestlers

References

External links

1974 births
Living people
Japanese sumo wrestlers
Sumo people from Hiroshima Prefecture
Sportspeople banned for life